Patricia Guerrero (born 22 August 1962) is a Peruvian athlete. She competed in the women's javelin throw at the 1980 Summer Olympics.

References

External links
 

1962 births
Living people
Athletes (track and field) at the 1980 Summer Olympics
Peruvian female javelin throwers
Olympic athletes of Peru
Place of birth missing (living people)
South American Games gold medalists for Peru
South American Games medalists in athletics
Competitors at the 1982 Southern Cross Games
20th-century Peruvian women
21st-century Peruvian women